There shall be showers of blessings is a Christian hymn which was written in 1883 by Daniel Webster (1840–1901) under the pseudonym of D. W. Whittle. It was given music by James McGranahan.

The hymn is based on the "showers of blessing" referred to in Ezekiel 34:26–27. Webster wrote under various pseudonyms, including Daniel W. Whittle, Daniel Webster White, Whittle Daniel, Nathan and El Nathan.

References 

American Christian hymns